An infill station (sometimes in-fill station) is
a train station built on an existing passenger rail, rapid transit, or light rail line to address demand in a location between existing stations. Such stations take advantage of existing train service and encourage new riders by providing a more convenient location. Many older transit systems have widely spaced stations and can benefit from infill stations. In some cases, new infill stations are built at sites where a station had once existed many years ago, for example the  station on the Chicago 'L''s Green Line.

Examples

Chile
Santiago
San José de la Estrella station, 2009

Canada
Toronto
North York Centre station, 1987
Vancouver
Lake City Way station, 2003
Capstan station (under construction)

Mainland China
Beijing
Tiantongyuan station, 2007 (Line 5)
Beiyunhedong station, 2018 (Line 6)
 (Line 13), 2019
Zhoujiazhuang station, 2021 (Line 17)
Beitaipingzhuang station, 2022 (Line 19)
Kandan station, 2022 (Line 16)
Erligou station, 2023 (under construction) (Line 6 and 16) 
Hongtaizhuang station, TBC (Line 16) (under construction)
Zhufangbei station, TBC (Changping line) (under construction)
Hongmiao station, 2025 (Line 14) (under construction) 
Shanghai
Chenxiang Highway station, 2020

Hong Kong SAR
Sheung Shui station, 1930
University station, 1956
Yau Ma Tei station, 1979
Mong Kok station, 1979
Prince Edward station, 1982
Kowloon Tong station (East Rail line), 1982
Tai Wai station, 1983
Fo Tan station, 1985
Tai Wo station, 1989
Nam Cheong station, 2003
Sunny Bay station, 2005
Kwu Tung Station, 2027
Tung Chung East Station ,2029
Hung Shui Kiu Station, 2030
Oyster Bay Station, 2030

Germany 

 Hamburg
 Rübenkamp, 1931
 Kiwittsmoor, 1959
 Oldenfelde, 2019
 Ottensen (planned)
 Nuremberg S-Bahn
 Erlangen Paul Gossen Straße (opened 2015) along the Nuremberg-Bamberg railway (S1)
 Nuremberg U-Bahn
 "University" (proposed) along U1 between Hasenbuck station and  Bauernfeindstraße station
 “Marienberg“ (proposed) along U2 between Airport and Ziegelstein station

France 

 Paris RER
 Rosa-Parks station, 2015
 Toulouse Metro
 Niel (planned and reserved)

Ireland 

 Dublin
 Woodbrook (DART)
 Pelletstown (Western Commuter Line)
 Cork
 Blarney / Stoneview (proposed)
 Monard (proposed)
 Blackpool / Kilbarry (proposed)
 Tivoli (proposed)
 Dunkettle (proposed)
 Carrigtwohill West (proposed)
 Water-rock (proposed)
 Ballynoe (proposed)

Japan
Aichi
, 2012 (Tokaido Main Line)
, 1995 (Tokaido Main Line)
Chiba
, 1951 (Chūō–Sōbu Line)
 , 2005 (Tobu Railway Urban Park Line)
Hiroshima
 Akinagahama, 1994 (Kure Line)
 Jike, 2017 (San'yo Main Line)
 Karugahama, 1999 (Kure Line)
 Kōdo-Homachigawa, 2017 (San'yō Main Line)
 , 1992 (Kure Line)
 Maezora, 2000 (San'yō Main Line)
 Mizushiri, 1999 (Kure Line)
 Ōmachi, 1994 (San'yō Main Line)
 , 2015 (Hiroshima Rapid Transit Astram Line, JR West San'yō Main Line)
 Shin-Hiro, 2002 (Kure Line)
 Tenjingawa, 2004 (San'yo Main Line)
Hyogo
Harima-Katsuhara, 2008 (San'yō Main Line)
Higashi-Himeji, 2016 (San'yō Main Line (JR Kōbe Line))
Himeji-Bessho, 2005 (San'yō Main Line (JR Kobe Line))
Kōnan-Yamate, 1996 (San'yō Main Line (JR Kobe Line))
Maya, 2016 (San'yō Main Line (JR Kobe Line))
Nihon-heso-kōen, 1985 (Kakogawa Line)
Sakura Shukugawa, 2007 (San'yō Main Line (JR Kobe Line))
Sumakaihinkōen, 2008 (San'yō Main Line (JR Kobe Line))
Kyoto
Emmachi, 2000 (Sagano Line (San'yo Main Line))
JR Fujinomori, 1997 (JR West Nara Line)
JR Ogura, 2001 (JR West Nara Line)
Katsuragawa, 2008 (Tokaido Main Line (JR Kyoto Line))
Shinkyū-Daigaku-mae, 1996 (San'in Main Line)
Umekōji-Kyōtonishi, 2019 (San'in Main Line (Sagano Line))
Nara
JR Goidō, 2004 (Wakayama Line)
Okayama
Kitanagase, 2005 (San'yo Main Line)
Nishigawara, 2008 (San'yo Main Line, Akō Line)
Osaka
 JR-Sōjiji, 2018 (Tokaido Main Line (JR Kyoto Line))
 Kizuri-Kamikita, 2018 (JR West Osaka Higashi Line)
 , 1975 (Kita-Osaka Kyuko Railway)
 Shimamoto, 2008 (Tokaido Main Line (JR Kyoto Line))
 , 1964 (Tokaido Main Line (JR Kyoto Line))
 Universal City, 2001 (Sakurajima Line)
Shiga
Minami-Kusatsu, 1994 (JR West Biwako Line (Tokaido Main Line))
Rittō, 1991 (Biwako Line (Tokaido Main Line))
Ono Station, 1988 (JR West Kosei Line)
Shizuoka
Nagaizumi-Nameri Station, 2002 (Gotemba Line)
Ōoka Station, 1946 (Gotemba Line)
Tokyo
, 1997 (Tokyo Metro Ginza Line)
, 2000 (Tokyo Metro Tōzai Line)
, 2020 (JR East Yamanote Line/Keihin-Tohoku Line)
, 2020 (Tokyo Metro Hibiya Line)
Tochigi
, 2018 (Ryōmō Line)
, 2017 (Tobu Kinugawa Line)
Tottori
Higashiyamakōen, 1993 (San'in Main Line)
Tottoridaigakumae, 1995 (San'in Main Line)
Toyama
Fuchū-Usaka, 2008 (Takayama Line)
, 2015 (Johana Line)
Yamaguchi
, 1999 (San'yo Shinkansen)
Kajikuri-Gōdaichi, 2008 (San'in Main Line)

Malaysia
KTM Komuter
Planned infill stations:
 Bukit Aman (proposed in 2019, between Kuala Lumpur and Bank Negara)
 United Point (proposed, between Kepong and Segambut)
 Maju KL (proposed, between Bandar Tasik Selatan and Serdang)

Opened infill stations:
 Abdullah Hukum (opened 2018, between KL Sentral and Angkasapuri)
 Mid Valley (opened 2004, between KL Sentral and Seputeh)
 KL Sentral (opened 2001, between Kuala Lumpur and Seputeh at opening)
 Kajang 2 (opened 2023, between Kajang and UKM)

Rapid Rail
Planned infill stations:
 Two unnamed future stations, one between Puchong Prima and Putra Heights, and one between IOI Puchong Jaya and Kinrara BK5.
 RRI, between Kampung Selamat and Kwasa Damansara.
 Teknologi, between Kwasa Sentral and Kota Damansara.
 Bukit Kiara, between TTDI and Phileo Damansara.
 Bandar Malaysia Utara and Bandar Malaysia Selatan, between Chan Sow Lin and Kuchai.
 Taman Teknologi, between Sungai Besi and Serdang Raya Utara.
 Taman Universiti, between UPM and Taman Equine.
 Taman Mesra, between Bukit Dukung and Sungai Jernih.
 Tropicana, between BU11 and Damansara Idaman
 Temasya, between Glenmarie and Kerjaya
 Raja Muda, between Dato Menteri and UiTM Shah Alam
 Bukit Raja Selatan, between Seksyen 7 Shah Alam and Bandar Baru Klang
 Bandar Botanik, between Bandar Bukit Tinggi and Johan Setia

Opened infill stations:
 Sri Rampai (opened 2010, between Wangsa Maju and Setiawangsa)

The Netherlands
Rotterdam
 Wilhelminaplein, 1997 (Rotterdam Metro)

Philippines
Philippine National Railways
Bucal station, proposed (PNR South Long Haul)

Singapore
 Mass Rapid Transit
 Dover MRT station, 2001
 Canberra MRT station, 2019
 Founders' Memorial MRT station, 2027
 Hume MRT station, 2025
 Brickland MRT station, TBC
 Sungei Kadut MRT station, TBC
 Bukit Brown MRT station, TBC.

South Korea
Korail
 Imae Station, 2004
 Yongdu Station, 2005
 Dongmyo Station, 2005
 Jukjeon Station, 2007
 Dangjeong Station, 2010
 Gangmae Station, 2014
 Wonheung Station, 2014
 Darwol Station, 2014

Spain
 Madrid
 Príncipe Pío, 1995 (Line 10 platforms)
 Canal (Madrid Metro), 1998
 Eugenia de Montijo (Madrid Metro), 1999
 Casa de Campo, 2002

Switzerland
 Bern
 Bern Wankdorf, 2004

Taiwan
Hsinchu
Beihu Station, 2012
Keelung
Badouzi Station, 2016
New Taipei City
South Shulin Station, 2015
Sanxingqiao Station, 2016
Taichung
Xinwuri Station, 2006
Lilin Station, 2018
Toujiacuo Station, 2018
Songzhu Station, 2018
Jingwu Station, 2018
Wuquan Station, 2018
Tainan
Rende Station, 2014

Thailand
 BTS Skytrain
 Saint Louis BTS station, 2021
 Sena Ruam BTS station, planned 2023
 SRT Red Lines
 Phra Ram 6 station, planned 2022
 Bang Kruai-EGAT station, planned 2022

United Kingdom
Leeds
Burley Park station, 1992
Kirkstall Forge station, 2016
London
Wembley Park tube station, 14 October 1893
 Barons Court tube station, 9 October 1905
 Preston Road tube station, 21 May 1908
 Moor Park tube station, 9 May 1910
 Stamford Brook tube station, 1 February 1912
 North Harrow tube station, 22 March 1915
 Northwick Park tube station, 28 June 1923
 South Kenton station, 3 July 1933
Northwood Hills tube station, 13 November 1933
Roding Valley tube station, 3 February 1936
Pudding Mill Lane DLR station, 1996
Langdon Park DLR station, 2007
Wood Lane tube station, 2008
Surrey Canal Road station, proposed
 Stations between Harrow-on-the-Hill and Uxbridge (except Ruislip) were open gradually to stimulate development around the area (1900s - 1910s)
 London Midland and Scottish Railway quadrupled the tracks between Barking and Upminster which enabled several stations to be built on the local line (1930s)
Liverpool
 Liverpool South Parkway railway station, 2006
Newcastle
 Northumberland Park Metro station, 2005

United States
 Atlanta
Peachtree Center station, 1982
 Pittsburgh
First Avenue station, 2001
 Philadelphia
Franklin Square station, 2024
 Greater Boston
Green St (elevated), 1912
Arlington station, 1921
Charles station, 1932
Science Park station, 1955
Quincy Adams station, 1983
Lansdowne station (formerly Yawkey), 1988, rebuilt 2012, renamed 2019
Assembly station, 2014
Fairmount Line
Talbot Avenue station, 2012
Newmarket station and Four Corners/Geneva station, 2013
Blue Hill Avenue station, 2019
Boston Landing station, 2017
West Station, planned 2040
 Washington metropolitan area
NoMa–Gallaudet U station, 2004
Potomac Yard station, under construction 
Wolf Trap station, proposed
Potomac Shores station, Virginia Railway Express, under construction
 San Francisco Bay Area
Fairfield–Vacaville station
Bay Area Rapid Transit
Embarcadero station, 1976
West Dublin/Pleasanton station, 2011
Sonoma–Marin Area Rail Transit
Novato–Downtown station, 2019
Petaluma North station, planned
 San Diego
Bayfront/E Street station, 1986
America Plaza station, 1991
Fenton Parkway station, 2000
 Greater Los Angeles
LAX/Metro Transit Center station, planned
Placentia station, planned
Chicagoland
Chicago "L"
 (/), 2012
, 2012
, 2015
, 2024
Metra
35th Street "Lou Jones"/Bronzeville, 2011
Romeoville, 2018
 Greater Salt Lake City
900 South station, 2005
Sandy Expo station, 2006
North Temple station, 2012
 St. Louis
East Riverfront station, 1994
Cortex station, 2018
 Greater New York
Fairfield Metro station, 2011
West Haven station, 2013
Intervale Avenue station, 1911
191st Street station, 1911
10th Avenue station, planned
 Cleveland
West 3rd station, 1999
 Minneapolis–Saint Paul
 American Boulevard station, 2009
 Portland, Oregon
 Mall/Southwest 4th Avenue and Mall/Southwest 5th Avenue stations, 1990–2020
 Convention Center station, 1990
 Civic Drive station, 2010
 Dallas
 West Irving station, 2000
 Cityplace/Uptown station, 2000
 Victory station, 2001
 Lake Highlands station, 2010
 Hidden Ridge station, 2021
 12th Street, planned
 Miami
Tri-Rail and Metrorail transfer station, 1989
Cypress Creek station, 1989
Boynton Beach station, 1989
Opa-locka station, 1996
Sheridan Street station, 1996
Museum Park station, 2013
 Albuquerque
 Bernalillo County/International Sunport station, 2007
 Downtown Bernalillo station, 2007
 Isleta Pueblo station, 2008
 Santa Fe County/NM 599 station, 2009
 Kewa Pueblo station, 2010
 Sandia Pueblo station, 2011
 Montaño station, 2014
 Zia Road station, 2017

References

Railway stations by type